The Macará River forms part of the border between Ecuador and Peru.

References

Border rivers
Rivers of Ecuador
Rivers of Peru
Ecuador–Peru border
International rivers of South America